The third season of the American television series Gotham, based on characters from DC Comics related to the Batman franchise, revolves around the characters of James "Jim" Gordon and Bruce Wayne. The season is produced by Primrose Hill Productions, DC Entertainment, and Warner Bros. Television, with Bruno Heller, Danny Cannon, John Stephens, and Ken Woodruff serving as executive producers. The season included inspirations from The Dark Knight Returns, Batman: The Killing Joke, and Batman: Death of the Family.

The season was ordered in March 2016 and every cast member from the last season returned with the exception of Zabryna Guevara as Sarah Essen; James Frain as Theo Galavan / Azrael; and Nicholas D'Agosto as Harvey Dent. New additions to the cast include Benedict Samuel as Jervis Tetch; and Maggie Geha as a grown Ivy Pepper, recasting the role portrayed by Clare Foley in previous seasons, who appears in a guest role. The season was broadcast over three consecutive runs: the first 11 episodes aired from September to November 2016; the next three aired in January 2017; and the other eight episodes aired from April to June 2017. Like the previous season, the season also holds two subtitles. The first 14 episodes are subtitled Mad City while the other eight episodes are subtitled Heroes Rise. The season premiered on September 19, 2016 and concluded on June 5, 2017 with a two-hour finale on Fox.

Plot
With the Indian Hill fugitives on the loose, Jim Gordon takes matters into his own hands as a bounty hunter. But will he find demented mastermind Hugo Strange and his deranged subject, Fish Mooney? Bullock and Barnes attempt to hold the front line on crime against burgeoning Super-Villains Oswald Cobblepot / Penguin, Edward Nygma / Riddler, the future Poison Ivy and Jervis Tetch, aka Mad Hatter. All the while, young Bruce Wayne discovers yet more secrets behind his parents' murder as he peels back the curtain on the infamous criminal organization the Court of Owls.

Cast and characters

Main
 Ben McKenzie as James "Jim" Gordon
 Donal Logue as Harvey Bullock
 David Mazouz as Bruce Wayne / 514A
 Morena Baccarin as Leslie "Lee" Thompkins
 Sean Pertwee as Alfred Pennyworth
 Robin Lord Taylor as Oswald Cobblepot / Penguin
 Erin Richards as Barbara Kean
 Camren Bicondova as Selina Kyle
 Cory Michael Smith as Edward Nygma / The Riddler
 Jessica Lucas as Tabitha Galavan
 Chris Chalk as Lucius Fox
 Drew Powell as Butch Gilzean / Cyrus Gold
 Maggie Geha as Ivy Pepper
 Benedict Samuel as Jervis Tetch
 Michael Chiklis as Nathaniel Barnes / The Executioner

Recurring 
 Leslie Hendrix as Kathryn Monroe
 James Carpinello as Dr. Mario Calvi
 Jamie Chung as Valerie Vale
 John Doman as Carmine Falcone
 Jada Pinkett Smith as Fish Mooney
 B. D. Wong as Hugo Strange
 Chelsea Spack as Isabella
 Raymond J. Barry as The Shaman
 Richard Kind as Mayor Aubrey James
 Naian Gonzalez Norvind as Alice Tetch
 Anthony Carrigan as Victor Zsasz
 Ivana Miličević as Maria Kyle
 Cameron Monaghan as Jerome Valeska
 James Remar as Frank Gordon
 Nathan Darrow as Victor Fries / Mr. Freeze
 Camila Perez as Bridgit Pike / Firefly

Notable guests
 Tonya Pinkins as Ethel Peabody
 James Andrew O'Connor as Tommy Bones
 Paul Reubens as Elijah Van Dahl
 Brian McManamon as Basil
 Paul Pilcz as Sonny Gilzean
 Alexander Siddig as Ra's al Ghul

Episodes

Production

Development 
The show was officially renewed by Fox for a 22-episode third season on March 16, 2016. David Madden, Fox's Entertainment President stated, "It takes a very special team to tell the tales of Gotham. For the past two seasons, Bruno, Danny and John have masterfully honored the mythology of Gotham and brought it to life with depth, emotion and memorable high drama."

At 2016 San Diego Comic-Con, executive producer John Stephens explained the structure for the season: "We're doing eleven [episodes] in the Fall, then there's three episodes in January, then the final run of seven or eight episodes in the Spring. [The three] is not a self-contained [series of] episodes, because it extends what we're doing in the Fall, but it is an ended story, so we'll arc it out." Just like the second season, the third season also carried a two subtitles for the season. The first 14 episodes of the season: Mad City; and the other 8 episodes: Heroes Rise. In June 2016, Drew Powell revealed on a tweet the first two episodes of the season.

Writing 
According to Stephens, the structure for the season "We extend [the longer story arcs] in season three. We've made the story even more serialized in season three. Everybody goes through a major character metamorphosis throughout the course of the year."

The fourth episode introduced a political aspect for the show, with critics noting emphasis on Donald Trump's 2016 campaign. Actor Robin Lord Taylor talked about the approach, "I think the Gotham writers are writing our actual reality right now, and that's probably the scariest thing you could possibly imagine. He tries to present himself as he thinks a candidate should look. There is a certain homage to a certain candidate who is out there which is entirely intentional. Our show is like any comic book in that the stories are written to reflect the times in which we live. Comic books are written with that idea in mind, the social climate. So our show is reflecting that."

In August 2016, the producers talked about introducing Harley Quinn into the series despite the character's success in the film Suicide Squad. Executive producer John Stephens explained that they would rather see a "proto-version" of Harley Quinn possibly in the third or fourth season. He also added introducing "proto-versions" of Killer Croc and Solomon Grundy in the show. In January 2017, the producers began to hint about Quinn's appearance in the third-season finale with Stephens claiming that "we might see her in episode 22" and that the character would be the "launching point" for the central plot of season 4 and finally a few days before the episode, David Mazouz claimed the character would appear in the episode. However, Quinn did not appear in the finale; it was confirmed in a June 2017 TVLine article that there were no plans at that time to feature Quinn on the show.

Casting 
On June 13, 2016, it was revealed that Ivy Pepper's character would be promoted to main cast member and the actress would be recast with an older actress. On June 22, 2016, Maggie Geha was cast in the new version, is "due to a brush with one of Hugo Strange's creatures, last seen escaping into the Gotham night at the end of Season 2." John Stephens spoke about this, "The mentality of the Ivy we have in our world is not the same as the Ivy who exists in the canon. She's a bit more of a loose cannon. And so she goes and creates a great deal of havoc in our world. And because she is still a 14-year-old, 15-year-old street teenager in the body of a 25-year-old woman, she doesn't know how to act in the world yet, and so she has to fumble her way about." Stephens also explained why they decided to recast her,  "We made the change for two reasons: The character Ivy in the comics, one of her greatest powers is the power of seduction. Everyone was much more comfortable with that with an older actress as opposed to a teenager. We want to explore that classic, canonical power of Ivy. And we didn't just make her older with that attack. When she's changed and transformed, there's a real character change as well. She'll still have some of the same traits, but she'll be much darker, more manipulative than the Ivy we've seen so far. There's a more evil quality to her as well. It's more than just physical."

In June 2016, it was revealed that the Mad Hatter would be appearing in the third season. On July 18, The Walking Deads vet Benedict Samuel was cast in the role, with the role described as "a talented hypnotist teetering on the edge of madness. He arrives in Gotham with an unwavering desire to find his sister, Alice, a young woman who went missing in the city years ago." On August 23, 2016, Naian Gonzalez Norvind was cast as his sister, Alice, with her role being described as "she has a powerful ability she was born with, that she thinks is a curse and Jervis Tetch aka Mad Hatter, thinks is a gift."

Other additions include Jamie Chung as Valerie Vale, with the role being described as "a crackerjack reporter dead set on uncovering the truth behind Indian Hill. Confident and dogged, she will do anything to get the scoop, and soon sets her sights on Gordon, who she believes is the key lead in her story." The note also revealed that the character is the aunt of fellow comic book character Vicki Vale. 3 days after the cast announcement, James Carpinello was cast as Mario Falcone, son of Carmine Falcone, whose role was described as "Mario has rejected his family's criminal ways and made a legitimate life for himself as a well-respected, Ivy League-educated ER doctor. He's kind, honest and trustworthy, making him the black sheep of the Falcone clan." In November 2016, James Remar was cast as Frank Gordon, Gordon's uncle, in a role that was described as "The elder Gordon left Gotham after Jim's father died, but 25 years later, he's back and looking to reconnect with his nephew. But Frank has a dark secret that will force Jim to choose between saving his family and saving Gotham." Remar is the second Dexter vet to join the show, the first being David Zayas. On January 10, 2017, Raymond J. Barry was announced to have a recurring role in the season as a man only known as the Shaman. His role was described as "a mysterious figure who enters Bruce's (Mazouz) life with the stated intention of unlocking the potential of his own mind." After much speculation, on March 2, 2017, Alexander Siddig was cast to portray Ra's al Ghul. He was described as being the leader behind the Court of Owls and also the leader of the League of Shadows.

Design 
The season also introduces Nygma finally accepting himself as The Riddler and the use of his signature green suit. Series regular Cory Michael Smith had been commenting for over a year that while he hadn't figured out how the costume for the Riddler would be, he was confident it would "certainly be a green suit"; stating that the fittings for the costume were already underway by July 2016. He also added that the new Riddler won't be like the version of Jim Carrey in the film Batman Forever. He claimed, "I want him to be kind of showy. So what we have as the Riddler costume is really classy, and that's kind of what we wanted."

After the winter finale's airing, new images and promos surfaced showcasing Nygma's green suit, signaling his recognition as the imminent Riddler. Smith commented, "When I put it on, we used the same tailors that make all my suits. It was just beautiful, with the black velvet. We have these gorgeous black shoes with just a hint of a purple/maroon thing, just on the shoes. I got really excited, because it was shocking on the rack, but then it was on my body and I was like, 'This feels so right.'" While initially hesitant about by the "glittery green suit", he said it was a happy day when he put on the suit although he has been multiple times hoping for the Riddler's signature cane. He also said about Nygma, "It's his time to declare that he has accepted the role that fate has given him, and he's going to be a villain, wreak havoc and show people that everyone has underestimated him. He started to feel like the world was deciding for him that it wasn't what he deserved or what he's going to have. That potentially could be one of the scariest (aspects), to be very smooth and poised." Executive producer John Stephens said, "The affection he has for tricks and plans and puzzles, it's his way of applying order to what he sees as a disordered universe." Stephens claimed that he saw his progression as a hero's journey rather than a tragedy.

Filming 
Filming for the season began on July 21, 2016, at Steiner Studios in Brooklyn, New York. Ben McKenzie, who portrays Gordon in the show, made his directional debut on the sixteenth episode, "Heroes Rise: These Delicate and Dark Obsessions". According to the releases, the episode was the first of the whole series to make an extensive use of wires during the action scenes. Previous scenes were done practically at the instance of McKenzie, who wanted the show to feel "grounded." McKenzie commented, "They wrote the episode so I was on location in 15, so we could shoot everything in one day. I only missed one day of prep to film as an actor in episode 15, and that allowed me to go through the full process, which, honestly, I've been through before because I've shadowed directors both on Southland and Gotham." He also added, "As a director, you're given a lot of people coming up to you constantly asking for your opinion on everything from which location you should shoot at, how that location should be dressed, props, casting, dialogue."

Release

Broadcast
The season premiered on Fox on September 19, 2016 and concluded on June 5, 2017 with a two-hour season finale. The season had two breaks between episodes, with a continuous run between them. The first 11 episodes aired from September 19 to November 28, 2016; three episodes aired from January 16 to January 30, 2017; and the final 8 episodes aired from April 24 to June 5, 2017.

Marketing
In July 2016, the cast and crew attended San Diego Comic-Con to discuss and promote the season and showing the debut trailer for the season.

Reception
On Rotten Tomatoes, the season has a score of 89% based on 158 reviews.

Ratings

References

Gotham (TV series) seasons
2016 American television seasons
2017 American television seasons